Bernard Trottier (born March 13, 1965) is a former Canadian politician. He was a Conservative Party member House of Commons of Canada who served from 2011 to 2015 representing the Toronto riding of Etobicoke—Lakeshore.  Trottier was elected in the 2011 federal election when he defeated the Leader of the Liberal Party, Michael Ignatieff, who was also the Leader of the Official Opposition.

In February 2015, Trottier was appointed Parliamentary Secretary to the Minister of Foreign Affairs and for La Francophonie. Previously, he was appointed Parliamentary Secretary to the Minister of Public Works and Government Services in September 2013.

Early years and education
Born and raised in St. Paul, Alberta, he was born to Dr. Léon Trottier and artist Terry Trottier.  After graduating from St. Paul Regional High School in 1983, Bernard Trottier went on to earn his B.Sc.Eng. from the University of Alberta in 1988 and his M.B.A. from the Richard Ivey School of Business at the University of Western Ontario in 1992.  He also attended l'École des Hautes Études Commerciales, l'Université de Montréal/École Polytechnique de Montréal, and the University of Ottawa.

Business career and community activities
Since graduating from the University of Western Ontario in 1992, Trottier has resided in Toronto. Trottier was a management consultant in the Toronto area before joining IBM Global Business Services as a senior consulting manager, a job he held at the time he was elected to Parliament. He previously served as the President of the Etobicoke—Lakeshore Conservative Association and of the Sunnylea Co-operative Nursery School.  He also volunteered as a coach in the Royal York Baseball League and the Islington Rangers Soccer League.

Entrance to politics
In the 2011 federal election, Trottier won the Toronto riding of Etobicoke—Lakeshore, defeating Leader of the Liberal Party, Michael Ignatieff, who was also the incumbent Leader of the Official Opposition.  The Liberal Party had held 20 of the 22 Toronto ridings prior to the election.

Trottier was initially considered a sacrificial lamb candidate; even he initially didn't expect to win.  However, he benefited from a collapse in Liberal support in Toronto which saw the Conservatives claim a total of eight seats in the city.  He also benefited from the endorsement of Toronto Mayor and Etobicoke resident Rob Ford. Voters were reportedly also concerned that Ignatieff might resign in the event the Liberals didn't do well. Reports suggested that Ignatieff had initially promised to move into a home inside his riding, but instead he resided in the Downtown Toronto neighbourhood of Yorkville, which rankled Etobicoke—Lakeshore residents and reinforced perceptions of Ignatieff's political opportunism.

Trottier was defeated by Liberal James Maloney in the 2015 election, taking 32 percent of the vote amid the Liberal wave that swept through Toronto.

Electoral record

Personal life
A Franco-Albertan, Trottier is fluently bilingual in French and English.  He and his wife, Susan Schutta, live in Etobicoke with their two children: Alexandre and Zoë.

References

External links
Official Website

1965 births
Living people
Conservative Party of Canada MPs
Members of the House of Commons of Canada from Ontario
Canadian management consultants
Franco-Albertan people
Franco-Ontarian people
University of Alberta alumni
University of Western Ontario alumni
People from Etobicoke
Politicians from Toronto
People from the County of St. Paul No. 19
21st-century Canadian politicians